Lyclene ashleigera is a moth of the family Erebidae. It was described by Jeremy Daniel Holloway in 2001. It is found on Borneo. The habitat consists of lowland dipterocarp forests.

The length of the forewings is 7–8 mm.

References

Nudariina
Moths described in 2001
Moths of Asia